Love Problems (literally "The Age of Uneasiness") is a 1968 Italian drama film directed by Giuliano Biagetti. It stars actor Gabriele Ferzetti. The film is based on a novel by Dacia Maraini.

Cast 
 Haydée Politoff 	as Enrica
 Jean Sorel 	as Giorgio
 Eleonora Rossi Drago 	as Countess
 Gabriele Ferzetti 	as Guido 
 Salvo Randone 
 Yorgo Voyagis 
 Claudio Gora

References

External links

1968 films
Italian drama films
1960s Italian-language films
Films directed by Giuliano Biagetti
1960s Italian films